Sadarak may refer to:
 Sadarak District, Azerbaijan
 Sadarak (town), Azerbaijan, small town, municipal centre of the Sadarak District